The 2012 Miami RedHawks football team represented Miami University in the 2012 NCAA Division I FBS football season. They were led by second-year head coach Don Treadwell and played their home games at Yager Stadium. They were a member of the East Division of the Mid-American Conference. They finished the season 4–8, 3–5 in MAC play to finish in a tie for fourth place in the East Division.

Schedule

Source: Schedule

Game summaries

@ Ohio State

Southern Illinois

@ Boise State

Massachusetts

@ Akron

@ Cincinnati

@ Bowling Green

Ohio

@ Buffalo

Kent State

@ Central Michigan

Ball State

References

Miami
Miami RedHawks football seasons
Miami RedHawks football